Oscar Sánchez (2 April 1910 – 22 March 1974) was a Chilean footballer. He played in two matches for the Chile national football team in 1941. He was also part of Chile's squad for the 1941 South American Championship.

References

External links
 

1910 births
1974 deaths
Chilean footballers
Chile international footballers
Place of birth missing
Association football midfielders
Universidad de Chile footballers